Choo may refer to:

People

Surname
 Alternative spelling of Chu (Korean name)
 Alternative spelling of Zhu (surname), a Chinese surname
 Spelling of Zhou (surname)
 Jimmy Choo (born 1961), Malaysian fashion designer now based in London

Given name
 Choo-Choo Coleman, American baseball player
 Choo Freeman (born 1979), American baseball player

Other meanings
 Choo, Chinese name for the star Alpha Arae
 Choo, village in Ghana near Adibo
 Choo, character in the Japanese manga and anime series One Piece

See also
 Cho (disambiguation)
 Chu (disambiguation)
 Chuu (disambiguation)